Dr. Neale Fong is a business leader, Churches of Christ chaplain, and former Australian rules football administrator and public servant in Perth, Western Australia. , he is chief executive officer and executive director of Bethesda Health Care, Chair of the Western Australian Country Health Service Board, managing director of his own consulting company and Director of a number of health companies. He is the owner of his management consulting company, Australias Health Advisory with a long track record in engagements with state, territory and commonwealth governments, private and not-for-profit health companies.

Career

Health services
His first medical job was at Royal Perth Hospital where he worked in terms including under Sir George Bedbrook at the RPH(RH) Spinal Unit and at the Port Hedland Regional Hospital. He was then appointed as a Venereologist in the VD Control Branch of the Health Department of WA where he established the first HIV/AIDS assessment clinic in 1985. He was part of a number of state and national committees involved in tackling the HIV/AIDS epidemic in the mid-1980s.

Returning to Perth in 1990, Fong took up roles in the newly named STD Control Branch in the Public Health Division of the Health Department of WA. He was asked to undertake a major review of STD/HIV services in Metropolitan Perth, which resulted in major changes to STD management. He established the inaugural Communicable Diseases Control Section of the Health Department of WA in 2003/04. In 1994, he was recruited to be the Director of Medical Service for the East Metro Health Service. With the resignation of the managing director of the State Health Purchasing Authority in 1995, Fong was appointed to the role and worked on the establishment of the new structure to be led by former Deputy Secretary of the Commonwealth Department of Health Alan Bansemer. Fong was appointed Chief General manager Operations with responsibility for all operational responsibilities with the health services in metro and country WA (the equivalent of a Chief Operating Officer role). After serving three years in this position, Fong  was recruited to be the CEO of Australia's largest private hospital at the time, St John of God Subiaco. He led the hospital in a major turnaround including the commencement of a $100M redevelopment program from 2000 to 2004. The first comprehensive cancer centre (later to be named the Bendat Comprehensive Cancer Centre) was established.

In 2004, he was appointed by the Gallop Ministry to implement reform in Western Australia's public health system. He became the executive chairman of the Health Reform and Implementation Taskforce, charged with implementing the recommendations of the Reid Report. He became director-general of the Department of Health, the state's highest-paid public servant with a salary of A$600,000, before resigning over findings alleged misconduct. No corruption charges were identified or laid.

In September 2012, Fong commenced an appointment by Health Solutions WA Pty Ltd (of which he was managing director) as managing director of Peel Health Campus, a private hospital at Mandurah which was also embroiled in allegations of fraud and corruption prior to Fong's appointment, It was found that doctors were being paid $200 per patient as inducement for admissions to the hospital. A subsequent parliamentary inquiry found that the scheme incorrectly generated $1.78 million from the Department of Health, which was able to recover the amount.
Within four months, Fong quit, announcing acquisition of the business by Ramsay Health Care.

Fong was appointed to the board of Prime Health, an occupational health and safety company, soon after and established his advisory service (Australis Health Advisory). He has consulted widely in Commonwealth and states on health and hospital and leadership development. Under Health Workforce Australia he held the project to form Australia's first health leadership competency framework (Health LEADS), which endures to this day.

In 2009, he became Chairman of Bethesda Hospital and held this position till 2019 when he was appointed CEO. He was formerly deputy chair of the Bethanie Group, interim CEO of Peel Health Campus and Chair of ASX listed company Chrysalis Resources for 8 years. He has also held a number of other ASX company director positions.  In 2010, he led the project for the establishment of the Curtin Medical School, which opened for students on 2017, and was Director of the Curtin Health and Innovation Research Institute (CHIRI) for two years.
 
In November 2015, he was appointed by the Minister of Health to chair the WA Country Health Service Board, one of five WA Health service boards.

Football
Neale Fong commenced his career with the West Perth Football Club colts and reserves teams. He was Captain of the Colts team in 1978 and was coached by East Perth legend Ken McCaullay. His career in the  Western Australian Amateur Football League as an Australian rules football player and administrator in 1981, After 12 years as a successful amateur player, he was elected a Commissioner of the West Australian Football Commission from 1999 until 2010, and chairman from 2002 until 2010. He has been described as "one of the most important figures in Western Australian football history.". He served as chaplain of the West Coast Eagles Football Club from 1993 to 2014. He is the President of WAFL club West Perth and brother of former West Perth captain Les Fong.

Education
Fong studied at the Balcatta Senior High School and graduated in 1976, serving as School Captain, Athletics Captain and Football First XVIII Captain. He was admitted to UWA Medical School in 1977, and graduated in 1982. In 1988, he moved to Vancouver British Columbia to undertake graduate theological studies at Regent College, University of British Columbia. He graduated with a Diploma in Christian Studies (DipCS) and a Master of Theological Studies (MTS) with a concentration in Applied Theology. He was Student Newspaper editor in 1999, and Student Body President and Senate Member in 1989/90. He was the Music Leader at Holy Trinity Anglican church in 1988–1990.

Fong graduated in the University of Western Australia's Graduate School of Management with an MBA in 1996. Also having degrees in medicine and theology.

Probono Roles
Fong was the director and chair of Youth Vision WA from 1990- 2015, having completed 41 years in youth work in the Churches of Christ. He was deputy chair of the WA Community Foundation established by former WA Governor Lieutenant Colonel John Sanderson. He is an inaugural director of Mindful Mediation Australia, a charity established to further mindfulness and better mental health in schools and in  business.  Fong is National and WA state President of the Australasian College of Health Service Management and was made an Honorary Fellow in 2011. He is also Chairman of the Rhonda Wyllie Foundation (2012–present), Chairman of the Bethesda Foundation and Fellow of the Australian Institute of Company Directors (AICD).

Awards
He was a finalist in the 2010 Western Australian Citizen of the Year Award (Community Service). He was also a recipient of the Centenary of Federation Medal in 2003.

References

External links
Stateline interview on the West Australian health system
Stateline interview on drugs in sport

Year of birth missing (living people)
Living people
Public servants of Western Australia
Australian members of the Churches of Christ
Ministers of the Churches of Christ
Australian people of Chinese descent
Australian chief executives